Brian Stanton may refer to:

 Brian Stanton (footballer) (born 1956), English former footballer
 Brian Stanton (high jumper) (born 1961), American high jumper